Denton is a city in Doniphan County, Kansas, United States.  As of the 2020 census, the population of the city was 130.

History
Denton was laid out in 1886. It was named for one of its founders, John Denton.

The first post office at the site of Denton was established in 1882. Prior to 1905, it was called Darwin for some time, then Dentonville.

Geography
Denton is located at  (39.731568, -95.270025).

Demographics

Denton is part of the St. Joseph, MO–KS Metropolitan Statistical Area.

2010 census
As of the census of 2010, there were 148 people, 63 households, and 42 families residing in the city. The racial makeup of the city was 93.9% White and 6.1% from two or more races. Hispanic or Latino of any race were 2.0% of the population.

There were 63 households, of which 36.5% had children under the age of 18 living with them, 50.8% were married couples living together, 9.5% had a female householder with no husband present, 6.3% had a male householder with no wife present, and 33.3% were non-families. 33.3% of all households were made up of individuals, and 15.8% had someone living alone who was 65 years of age or older. The average household size was 2.35 and the average family size was 2.95.

The median age in the city was 43.5 years. 20.9% of residents were under the age of 18; 12.2% were between the ages of 18 and 24; 18.3% were from 25 to 44; 36.5% were from 45 to 64; and 12.2% were 65 years of age or older. The gender makeup of the city was 50.0% male and 50.0% female.

2000 census
As of the census of 2000, there were 186 people, 71 households, and 47 families residing in the city. The racial makeup of the city was 99.46% White, and 0.54% from two or more races. Hispanic or Latino of any race were 0.54% of the population.

There were 71 households, out of which 38.0% had children under the age of 18 living with them, 62.0% were married couples living together, 2.8% had a female householder with no husband present, and 33.8% were non-families. 32.4% of all households were made up of individuals, and 22.5% had someone living alone who was 65 years of age or older. The average household size was 2.62 and the average family size was 3.40.

In the city, the population was spread out, with 33.9% under the age of 18, 4.8% from 18 to 24, 29.0% from 25 to 44, 15.1% from 45 to 64, and 17.2% who were 65 years of age or older. The median age was 35 years. For every 100 females, there were 95.8 males. For every 100 females age 18 and over, there were 89.2 males.

The median income for a household in the city was $30,500, and the median income for a family was $40,625. Males had a median income of $31,875 versus $20,417 for females. The per capita income for the city was $12,872. None of the families and 4.5% of the population were living below the poverty line, including no under eighteens and 6.9% of those over 64.

Education
The community is served by Doniphan West USD 111 public school district.

References

Further reading

External links
 City of Denton
 Denton - Directory of Public Officials
 Denton city map, KDOT

Cities in Kansas
Cities in Doniphan County, Kansas
St. Joseph, Missouri metropolitan area
1886 establishments in Kansas
Populated places established in 1886